Kagoshima is a city in Japan.

Kagoshima may also refer to:
Kagoshima Prefecture, a prefecture of Japan (Kagoshima City is the capital of this prefecture)
Satsuma Domain, a historical region in Japan, also known as Kagoshima
Kagoshima Station, a station in Kagoshima City
Kagoshima Airport, an airport in Kagoshima Prefecture
4703 Kagoshima, a minor planet, also called 1988 BL

See also
Kagoshima dialect, a group of dialects of the Japanese language
Kagoshima Main Line, a train line in Japan